Newman Field may refer to:

 Newman Field (Salisbury, North Carolina), a stadium on the campus of Catawba College, Salisbury, North Carolina
 Newman Field (Sweetwater), a ballpark located in Sweetwater, Texas
 Newman Outdoor Field, a baseball stadium in Fargo, North Dakota